Paracomitas is a genus of sea snails, marine gastropod mollusks in the family Pseudomelatomidae.

Description
The genus Paracomitas has a carinate protoconch which lies in the same cone as the spire, thus differing from typical Comitas in which the protoconch is noncarinate, bulbous and tilted. Although the type of Comitas, C. oamarutica (Suter), is Drillia-like in the ornamentation of its spire, some species referred to Comitas by Powell on the basis of the protoconch, such as Comitas allani  Powell, are similar in adult sculpture to Paracomitas. The protoconch of the species here referred to Paracomitas is small and appears to be slightly tilted, and the last quarter-turn or less is slightly angulate, but not definitely carinate.

Species
Species within the genus Paracomitas include:
 Paracomitas augusta (Murdock & Suter, 1906)
 † Paracomitas beui Maxwell, 1988 
 † Paracomitas flemingi (Beu, 1970) 
 † Paracomitas gemmea (R. Murdoch, 1900) 
 Paracomitas haumuria Beu, 1979
 † Paracomitas protransenna (P. Marshall & R. Murdoch, 1923) 
 † Paracomitas rodgersi MacNeil, 1960  
 Paracomitas undosa (Schepman, 1913)
Alternate representations
 Paracomitas (Macrosinus) Beu, 1970 represented as Paracomitas Powell, 1942
 Paracomitas (Macrosinus) haumuria Beu, 1979 represented as Paracomitas haumuria Beu, 1979
Species brought into synonymy
 Paracomitas gypsata (Watson, 1881): synonym of Gymnobela gypsata (Watson, 1881)

References

External links
 
 Bouchet, P.; Kantor, Y. I.; Sysoev, A.; Puillandre, N. (2011). A new operational classification of the Conoidea (Gastropoda). Journal of Molluscan Studies. 77(3): 273-308
 Worldwide Mollusc Species Data Base: Pseudomelatomidae

 
Pseudomelatomidae